Dagmar Midcap (born Dagmar Gottschalk; March 12, 1969) is a Canadian-born American media personality, weathercaster and actor originally based in Vancouver, British Columbia. She has been the weekday evening weather anchor for KNSD-TV in San Diego, California since 2011.

Career

Television
A graduate of British Columbia Institute of Technology's broadcast journalism program in 1990, Midcap began her television career on WBNX-TV in Akron, Ohio, appearing on a weekly current affairs program (1990–1998). She then returned to British Columbia, where she worked as the traffic and weather reporter on VTV's Breakfast before moving to Global Television Network's BCTV Morning Show as a fill-in traffic reporter. 

Moving away from live television, she hosted Crash Test Mommy on the Life Network. In 2005 she became co-host of BCTV's Driving Television, a weekly survey of automotive industry news for which she test drove new cars on a regular basis. It was broadcast nationally in Canada on Global.

In 2007 she returned to the United States where she became the weather and traffic anchor for the Better Mornings morning show on CBS affiliate WGCL-TV in Atlanta, Georgia, beginning in April. As of January 2008, she became the main weather anchor for WGCL-TV, doing forecasts during the late afternoon and evening newscasts. Midcap tendered her notice to the station on September 3, 2010 citing ongoing emotional and physical distress as a result of her boyfriend's suicide. The station acknowledged her departure on September 7, 2010.

On October 25, 2011, Midcap started as the weekday evening weather anchor for KNSD-TV in San Diego, California, an NBC owned-and-operated station.

Acting career
In Canada, Midcap often appeared in film and television series produced in the Vancouver area. She has appeared in such films as Catwoman, Baby Geniuses 2 and Air Bud: Seventh Inning Fetch. Television appearances have included Smallville, Stargate SG-1, Dead Zone, Just Cause, Medium, Touching Evil and Twilight Zone, among others. She has also had recurring roles on the series Dark Angel.

References

External links

Dagmar Midcap's Official Site

1969 births
British Columbia Institute of Technology alumni
Television personalities from Atlanta
Canadian television personalities
Living people
Canadian women television personalities